Franjo Lovrić (1 April 1923 – 5 February 1982) was a Bosnian and Yugoslav professional footballer and manager who captained FK Sarajevo as a player, and then went on to manage it a decade later.

Playing career

Club
He began his career in 1938 with local Sarajevo club SAŠK, whom he represented until the Nazi invasion of Yugoslavia in 1941. After the end of the war the new communist authorities placed a ban on numerous football clubs throughout the country including SAŠK. He quickly joined Željezničar, but wore the blue jersey for only two seasons, eventually moving to newly-formed FK Sarajevo in 1947.  He would go on to play and captain the club for another 12 years.

International
He was capped once for Yugoslavia B.

Managerial career
After retiring from professional football he became part of the club's youth coaching staff, a position he held until 1965 when he was named assistant to manager and former team colleague Miroslav Brozović. The duo would go on to win the club's first Yugoslav League title in 1967.  After Brozović's departure he took over the helm and led Sarajevo for one more season.

Personal life
His younger brother Đuka Lovrić was also a FK Sarajevo player but died prematurely in 1957 as the result of a serious heart condition.

Death
Lovrić died on 5 February 1982 in Sarajevo, SFR Yugoslavia, at the age of 58.

References

1923 births
1982 deaths
Footballers from Sarajevo
Association football midfielders
Yugoslav footballers
FK Željezničar Sarajevo players
FK Sarajevo players
Yugoslav First League players
Yugoslav football managers
FK Sarajevo managers